The Reggane series was a group of 4 atmospheric A-bomb nuclear tests conducted by France between February 1960 and April 1961, close to the end of the Algerian War. The bombs were detonated at the Saharan Military Experiments Centre near Reggane, French Algeria in the Sahara desert region of Tanezrouft, by the Nuclear Experiments Operational Group (GOEN), a unit of the Joint Special Weapons Command. The series saw the explosion of the first French nuclear weapon and was followed by the In Ekker series.

Codenames 
All four operations were named after the jerboa (Gerboise), a desert rodent found in the Sahara, with the adjunction of a colour. The first three colours adjuncted (blue, white and red) are said to come from the French Flag.

Chart of the tests

See also 

 List of nuclear weapons tests of France
 Nuclear weapons and France
 Force de Frappe
 History of nuclear weapons

Notes

References 

Reggane
1960 in Algeria
1961 in Algeria
History of the Sahara
Algerian War
Algeria–France relations
1960 in science
1960 in military history
1960 in politics